USDP may stand for:
 United States Democratic Party, one of the main two political parties in the United States
 Union Solidarity and Development Party, a political party in Myanmar (Burma)
 Unified Software Development Process